Ableh-ye Sofla (also Romanized as Ābleh-ye Soflá and Ābleh Soflá; also known as Ābeleh-ye Pā’īn, Ābleh, Ābleh-ye Pā’īn, and Ābleh-ye Pāīn) is a village in Holayjan Rural District, in the Central District of Izeh County, Khuzestan Province, Iran. At the 2006 census, its population was 215, in 38 families.

References 

Populated places in Izeh County